Fábio do Passo Faria (born 24 April 1989) is a Portuguese former footballer who played as a central defender.

Club career
Born in Vila do Conde, Faria finished his development at hometown club Rio Ave FC, having arrived aged 16 from FC Porto. In 2007, with the side in the second division, he was promoted to the first team, appearing in two games as they returned to the Primeira Liga.

After almost no competitive appearances in the 2008–09 season, Faria became an undisputed starter the following campaign – 27 matches, one goal, partnering veteran Gaspar as the team retained their league status – and was also first summoned to the Portuguese under-21s. In December 2009, his solid performances earned him a transfer to S.L. Benfica on a four-year contract for an estimated fee of €2 million, effective for 2010–11.

In January 2011, after only having featured once for Benfica (45 minutes in a 2–0 home win against C.S. Marítimo in the group stage of the Taça da Liga, where he played as a left back), Faria was loaned to Real Valladolid of the Spanish Segunda División until June.

Still owned by Benfica, Faria split the 2011–12 season with F.C. Paços de Ferreira and former club Rio Ave. With the latter, after a game against Moreirense F.C. in the League Cup, he felt indisposed and had to be taken to hospital with a heart condition, which put his career on hold for several months; his retirement was completed in March 2013, at the age of only 23.

Personal life
Faria's father, Francisco (born 22 October 1964), was also a footballer. A striker, he also started his career at Rio Ave, and went on to play professionally for 13 years in representation of seven teams (notably C.F. Os Belenenses), amassing top-division totals of 199 games and 62 goals.

Honours
Benfica
Taça da Liga: 2010–11

References

External links

1989 births
Living people
People from Vila do Conde
Portuguese footballers
Association football defenders
Primeira Liga players
Liga Portugal 2 players
Padroense F.C. players
Rio Ave F.C. players
S.L. Benfica footballers
F.C. Paços de Ferreira players
Segunda División players
Real Valladolid players
Portugal youth international footballers
Portugal under-21 international footballers
Portuguese expatriate footballers
Expatriate footballers in Spain
Portuguese expatriate sportspeople in Spain
Sportspeople from Porto District